Jump Up may refer to:

Music
 Jump up, a subgenre of the Bouyon music of Dominica, Martinique and Guadeloupe
 Jump-up (drum and bass), a subgenre of drum and bass
 Jump-up Day, the last day of the Carnival of Montserrat

Albums
Jump Up (EP), by Korean group F.T. Island, 2009
Jump Up (Supercar album), a 1999 album from the Japanese rock group Supercar
Jump Up! (Elton John album), 1982
Jump Up! (Pe'z album), 2012
Jump Up – 9492, a 2006 album by Joey Yung

Songs
"Jump Up", a 1963 song by Monty Norman
"Jump Up", a 1987 song by Admiral Bailey
 "Jump Up", a 2008 song by Mumzy Stranger
 "Jump Up", a 2009 song from by Major Lazer from Guns Don't Kill People... Lazers Do
"Jump Up!", a 1977 song by Elvis Costello from My Aim Is True
 "Jump Up, Super Star!", soundtrack of Super Mario Odyssey

Other uses
 Jump-up, the common name for Viola cornuta, a plant in the violet family
Jump up (Australia), a colloquial name for a type of mesa in the Australian Outback

See also
 Johnny Jump Up (disambiguation)